The New York Musical Festival (NYMF) was an annual three-week summer festival that operated from 2004 to 2019. It presented more than 30 new musicals a year in New York City's midtown theater district. More than half were chosen by leading theater artists and producers through an open-submission, double-blind evaluation process; the remaining shows were invited to participate by the Festival's artist staff. The festival premiered over 447 musicals, which featured the work of over 8,000 artists and were attended by more than 300,000 people.

More than 100 NYMF shows went on to further productions. By NYMF's count, alumni productions have been produced in all 50 US states and in 27 countries, and have been seen by roughly four million people.  Over 20 NYMF shows have had cast albums recorded.

History
In addition to full productions, NYMF presented a wide range of special events, readings and concerts of new music, educational seminars, explorations of musicals in TV and film, and unusual collaborations with other New York-based arts organizations. In 2011, The Festival introduced NYMF meets NYMIF, partnering with the New York Musical Improv Festival in a weekly series in which NYMF performers were paired with performers from the Magnet Theater to create completely improvised musicals.

In 2005, the Festival featured a series of co-productions with the Upright Citizens Brigade Theater exploring the nexus of improvisation and musical theater. NYMF has also partnered with The Paley Center each season to present special screenings of Musicals on Television.

Additionally, in 2005 the New York Musical Theatre Festival received the 21st Jujamcyn Theaters Award, a $100,000 prize given to a not-for-profit institution that has made an "outstanding contribution to the development of creative talent for the theatre."

NYMF also featured a Dance Series, celebrating the fusion of musical theatre and dance. Each series included one new musical commissioned by the Festival: Common Grounds (2006), Platforms (2007), Wild About Harry (2008), and Andy Warhol Was Right (2009).

During the off-season, NYMF produced a number of concerts, from large star-studded evenings like "The Unauthorized Musicology of Ben Folds", to intimate events like a salon with composer Duncan Sheik. It also operated a year-round writer service program, The Next Link Project, which provided dramaturgical, professional, entrepreneurial and financial support to help writers bring their musicals to fruition as fully staged productions.  The Next Link Project culminated with twelve writing teams each year receiving subsidized productions in NYMF's fall Festival.

On July 17, 2008, the musical title of show became the first show to transfer from the New York Musical Theatre Festival to a commercial Broadway production when it opened at the Lyceum Theatre. The show closed October 12, 2008 after playing 13 previews and 102 performances. It was produced by Kevin McCollum, the producer of Rent and Avenue Q, as well as Roy Miller, producer of Drowsy Chaperone, the Vineyard Theatre, Laura Camien and Kris Stewart, founder emeritus of the New York Musical Theatre Festival.

In 2009, Next To Normal became the second show to transfer from the New York Musical Theatre Festival to a commercial Broadway production. It became a smash hit at the Booth Theatre, winning three Tony Awards, including Best Score and Best Leading Actress In A Musical. "Next To Normal" went on to win the 2010 Pulitzer Prize for Drama, only the ninth musical to be so honored in the history of that award.

Additionally,  in 2009, NYMF began a partnership with the Daegu International Musical Theatre Festival (DIMF), which shares its dedication to new musicals and new artists. The partnership includes a production exchange, which began with the hit Korean production of My Scary Girl at NYMF, and continued in the Summer of 2010 with the 2009 NYMF musical Academy at DIMF. NYMF's Korean production of Academy received awards for Best Musical and Best Supporting Actor at the annual Daegu Musical Theater Awards.

In 2013, NYMF won a Special Drama Desk Award "for a decade of creating and nurturing new musical theater, ensuring the future of this essential art form."

Nerds: A Musical Software Satire, from NYMF 2005, was meant to be the fourth Broadway transfer of a NYMF show when it opened at the Longacre Theatre in 2016.  However, it lost a major investor a month before its scheduled opening, when the cast was already in rehearsal, and the opening was cancelled.

On January 2, 2020, NYMF abruptly announced that it was shutting down, ceasing operations immediately.

NYMF Awards for Excellence
At the end of every festival starting in 2006, a jury of Broadway professionals gave out awards for excellence to the deserving productions in that year's festival.  There is also a "Best of Fest" award that the public votes for.

References

Notes

External links
 The New York Musical Theatre Festival Official Site
 New York Musical Theatre Festival Downstage Center XM radio interview at American Theatre Wing, 2006
  Los Angeles Times feature on the 2006 New York Musical Theatre Festival

Theatre festivals in the United States
Musical
Musical
Musical theatre organizations